Denham Washington Brown (born January 6, 1983) is a Canadian former professional basketball player.

High school 
Brown attended Bathurst Heights Secondary School in Toronto, and led the school's AAA basketball team to the Ontario provincial championship in 2000. In his junior year, he averaged 30 points per game (ppg). However, he transferred to West Hill Collegiate Institute for his senior season after Bathurst Heights closed. In 2002, his senior year, Brown was highly celebrated in the media when he scored 111 points in a basketball game against R. H. King Academy. After Brown scored 111 points in a game he was featured in SLAM magazine; not only because of the 111 points, but also because he had committed to an elite college program at the University of Connecticut (UConn).

College 
Brown was a sophomore at UConn when the Huskies won the 2004 national championship. In his senior year at UConn (2005-06 season), he averaged 10.7 points, 1.3 assists, and 4.4 rebounds per game. In November the Huskies beat Gonzaga to win the Maui Invitational on a last-second jumper by Brown. His season-high came during a game against Villanova in which he scored 23 points. In the regional finals of the 2006 NCAA tournament, Brown made a last-second lay-up to force overtime against George Mason, but missed a potential game-winning three pointer at the buzzer resulting in an 86-84 loss. During his tenure with the Huskies, Brown had a reputation for being a clutch performer, as well as possessing an above average handle for a wing player.

NBA 
Brown was selected with the 40th pick in the 2nd round in the 2006 NBA Draft by the Seattle SuperSonics. After playing two preseason games with totals of eight points and five rebounds with the Sonics, he was waived by the team on October 26, 2006. However, the Tulsa 66ers subsequently used the eighth overall pick in the 2006 NBA D-League Draft on Brown.

In his first preseason game with the SuperSonics, Brown scored 8 points in a winning effort against the Portland Trail Blazers. After that game Brown saw little action for the SuperSonics in the preseason appearing in just one more game. He was playing well in the D-League averaging close to 19 ppg for the Tulsa 66ers.

On November 7, 2008, Brown was selected with the 9th pick in the first round of the 2008 NBA D-League Draft by the Utah Flash. He began the 2008–09 season with the Dakota Wizards.

On December 19, 2008, Brown was waived by the Wizards due to injury.

On March 4, 2009, Brown signed with the D-League's Iowa Energy.

Overseas 
Brown left the Tulsa 66ers later in the 2006–07 season, and played in a pro league in Turkey for Galatasaray Café Crown. For the 2007–08 season, he signed with the Serie A Italian team Tisettanta Cantù.

Brown took his talents to Philippines for three weeks in June 2010, as one of a series of import players for the Philippine Basketball Association's Barangay Ginebra Kings.

On August 25, 2010, Polish league champion for two straight years, Asseco Prokom Gdynia, added Brown to their roster.

National team 
Brown has extensive experience playing on the Canadian national team. He first made the team in 2003 when he was on the roster for the FIBA Americas Qualification Tournament. At the FIBA Tournament he played in ten games, starting none of them; but he averaged 12.4 ppg, 4.2 rebounds per game (rpg), 1.0 assist per game (apg) and 20 minutes per game (mpg). In 2004, he was on the roster for the Four Nations Tournament. At that tournament, he upped his scoring average to 13.8 ppg, while starting all six games and averaging 23.3 mpg, 5.3 rpg, and 1.3 apg. He also played with the team in 2005, but did not play in 2006, as he was attempting to play in NBA. Brown played for the team during the 2007 FIBA Americas Championship.

NBL Canada 
On October 11, 2011, it was announced that Brown had signed a deal with the National Basketball League of Canada's Oshawa Power.  Not only does this give him the opportunity to play professionally in his native Canada, but it also marks his return to the Greater Toronto Area, of which Oshawa is a part.

Honours
 2004 NCAA Champion

See also
 List of basketball players who have scored 100 points in a single game

References

External links 

UConn Profile
ESPN Profile
NBDL stats

1983 births
Living people
Barangay Ginebra San Miguel players
BC Dnipro players
Black Canadian basketball players
Canadian expatriate basketball people in Turkey
Canadian expatriate basketball people in the United States
Canadian expatriate basketball people in the Philippines
Canadian expatriate basketball people in Romania
Ciclista Olímpico players
Dakota Wizards players
Canadian expatriate basketball people in Argentina
Canadian expatriate basketball people in Venezuela
Canadian expatriate basketball people in Ukraine
Galatasaray S.K. (men's basketball) players
Iowa Energy players
Marinos B.B.C. players
Oshawa Power players
Pallacanestro Cantù players
Philippine Basketball Association imports
Seattle SuperSonics draft picks
Shooting guards
Small forwards
Basketball players from Toronto
Tulsa 66ers players
UConn Huskies men's basketball players
2010 FIBA World Championship players
Canadian expatriate basketball people in Italy